Sarcalumenin is a protein that in humans is encoded by the SRL gene.

Sarcalumenin is a calcium-binding protein that can be found in the sarcoplasmic reticulum of striated muscle. Sarcalumenin is partially responsible for calcium buffering in the lumen of the sarcoplasmic reticulum and helps out calcium pump proteins. Additionally, sarcalumenin is necessary for keeping a normal sinus rhythm during both aerobic and anaerobic exercise activity.

References

External links 
 

Cell signaling
Signal transduction